is a railway station in the town of Takahama, Ōi District, Fukui Prefecture, Japan, operated by West Japan Railway Company (JR West).

Lines 

Station layout
The station consists of two opposed side platforms connected by a footbridge. The station has a Midori no Madoguchi staffed ticket office.

Platforms

Adjacent stations

History
Wasasa-Takahama Station was opened on 3 April 1921.  With the privatization of Japanese National Railways (JNR) on 1 April 1987, the station came under the control of JR West.

Passenger statistics
In fiscal 2016, the station was used by an average of 325 passengers daily (boarding passengers only).

Surrounding area
Takahama Town Hall

See also
 List of railway stations in Japan

References

External links

  

Railway stations in Fukui Prefecture
Stations of West Japan Railway Company
Railway stations in Japan opened in 1921
Obama Line
Takahama, Fukui